Gerran Walker (born October 2, 1983) is a former American football wide receiver. He was originally signed by the Indianapolis Colts as an undrafted free agent in 2006.

He played college football at Lehigh.

Early years
Walker attended Alonzo Crim High School in Atlanta, Georgia and was a letterman in football, basketball, baseball, and track.

Professional career
From 2006 to 2008, he was signed to the practice rosters of the San Diego Chargers and Pittsburgh Steelers.

From 2008 to 2009, he was a member of the CFL's Saskatchewan Roughriders, playing 19 games and amassing a combined 866 yards.

On February 25, 2010, Walker signed as a free agent for the Toronto Argonauts as a wide receiver/kick returner. He was released by the team on July 8, 2010.

External links
Just Sports Stats
Indianapolis Colts bio
Pittsburgh Steelers bio

1983 births
Living people
Players of American football from Atlanta
American football wide receivers
Lehigh Mountain Hawks football players
Indianapolis Colts players
San Diego Chargers players
Pittsburgh Steelers players
Saskatchewan Roughriders players